Peter Otunuya Odili (born 15 August 1948) was the third Governor of Rivers State in Nigeria from 29 May 1999 to 29 May 2007. Odili is a member of the People's Democratic Party (PDP).

Background

Peter Odili was born on 15 August 1948 in the Ogba/Egbema/Ndoni Local Government Area of Rivers State. Odili graduated from the Medical School of the University of Nigeria, Nsukka, and pursued post-graduate work in Tropical Medicine at the University of Liverpool in the United Kingdom. 
Dr. Peter Odili is married to Justice Mary Ukaego Odili (b. 12 May 1952).

In 1988/89, Odili was elected member and leader of Rivers State Delegates to the Constituent Assembly. 
In 1992, he was elected as the Deputy Governor of Rivers State. After the Nigerian Third Republic ended, he was again elected to the National Constitutional Conference and became the Conference Committee Chairman on State Creation. Odili thereafter became the National Secretary of the defunct Democratic Party of Nigeria (DPN).

Governorship

Odili was elected governor of Rivers State during the 1999 Rivers State gubernatorial election, and was reelected in April 2003. 

In September 2004, Amnesty International wrote an open letter to Odili expressing deep concerns for protection of human rights of civilians in and around Port Harcourt, detailing an increasingly alarming security situation in Rivers State, due to fighting allegedly between rival armed groups.
In December 2004, a gang of armed youths believed to be members of the Egbesu cult attacked Odili's convoy along the East-West Road in Port Harcourt killing two people one a policeman 
In March 2009, the Rivers State Truth and Reconciliation Commission, headed by retired Supreme Court Justice Kayode Eso, blamed the crisis during Odili's period of office on both the state and the Federal Governments, particularly the administration of President Olusegun Obasanjo. The report outlined interwoven problems of failed governance, chieftaincy tussles, cultism, politics of acrimony and insurgency.

During his governorship, Rivers State was in theory one of the wealthiest states in the country [i.e. Lagos state, Delta state and Rivers State, due to oil and other business infrastructure], but Odili instituted  relatively few improvements.
In January 2007, the Economic and Financial Crimes Commission (EFCC) under Nuhu Ribadu issued an interim report on the governor that pointed to severe implications of fraud, conspiracy, conversion of public funds, foreign exchange malpractice, money laundering, stealing and abuse of oath of office.
At around the same time Human Rights Watch issued a report detailing pervasive patterns of corruption and mismanagement at the state and local levels under Odili's administration.
In February 2007, Odili filed a suit challenging the powers of the EFCC to probe his administration in Rivers State.

In November 2006, Odili announced that he would run for president in the 2007 election under the ruling PDP. 
However a day before the PDP's presidential primaries held on 16 December 2006, Odili stepped down from the contest, paving the way for another governor, Umaru Musa Yar'Adua, to emerge as the party's flag bearer.

Later career

In June 2008, Odili defended his record before the Rivers State Truth and Reconciliation Commission, denying the charges that had been made against him.

As of December 2007, the office of Attorney General then headed by Michael Aondoakaa had refused to file any defense in court against Odili's claim that the EFCC was not authorized to investigate his administration. In March 2008, a Port Harcourt court ruled that the EFCC could not investigate state finances. In September 2009, a Federal High Court sitting in Abuja issued an interim injunction stopping the EFCC from arresting, detaining, prosecuting or embarrassing Odili over a N189m bank debt.
However, a few days later the EFCC summoned Odili over alleged debts owed to five banks whose Managing Directors and board had recently been removed by the Central Bank of Nigeria.

In December 2009, the New York Times published an article about the kidnapping industry in Africa. The author talked to a man called Adiele Nwaeze (a professional kidnapper), who accused Odili of having paid him to help rig an election ten years ago by robbing ballot boxes. Odili denied the accusation.

In September 2010, it was reported that former military head of state Ibrahim Babangida, who planned to be a candidate for president in the 2011 election, was in discussions with Odili over being his running mate as vice-presidential candidate. The choice was said to be due in part to a close relationship between Odili and Raymond Dokpesi, the director general of Babangida's campaign.

See also
List of Governors of Rivers State
Deputy Governor of Rivers State

References

External links
 Official website of Rivers State Government
 Onelga.com - Peter Odili page

1948 births
Living people
Governors of Rivers State
Igbo politicians
Rivers State Peoples Democratic Party politicians
University of Nigeria alumni
Medical doctors from Rivers State
Deputy Governors of Rivers State
People from Ogba–Egbema–Ndoni
Peoples Democratic Party state governors of Nigeria